Irpa may refer to:
 Þorgerðr Hölgabrúðr and Irpa - Irpa, a goddess in Norse mythology
 Immigration and Refugee Protection Act
 International Radiation Protection Association
 International Rugby Players' Association